Marescotti is a surname. Notable people with the surname include:

Bartolomeo Marescotti (c. 1590-1630), Italian painter
Claudio Marescotti (1520–1590), Italian Roman Catholic bishop
Galeazzo Marescotti (1627–1726), Italian Roman Catholic cardinal
Giovanni Luigi Marescotti (died 1587), Italian Roman Catholic bishop
Ivano Marescotti (born 1946), Italian actor
Luigi Aldrovandi Marescotti (1876–1945), Italian politician and diplomat
Marco Antonio Marescotti (died 1681), Italian Roman Catholic bishop
Pietro Abbati Marescotti (1768–1842), Italian mathematician